Rachiine, Rachaaine,    is a village in Zgharta District, in the Northern Governorate of Lebanon.  Its population is  Maronite Christian.

References

External links
  Rachaine, Localiban 
 Ehden Family Tree

Populated places in the North Governorate
Zgharta District
Maronite Christian communities in Lebanon